Galija Sattarova (born 25 July 1983) is an Estonian underwater finswimmer.

She was born in Tallinn. In 2005 she graduated from Tallinn University of Technology in telecommunications speciality.

She began her swimming career in 1992, coached by Andrei Arno. Since 1997 her coach is Maksim Merkur. In 2004 and 2007 she won bronze medal at world championships. In 2003 she won gold medal at European championships. In 2005 she won bronze medal at World Games in finswimming. She is 52-times Estonian champion in different swimming disciplines. 2000–2010 she was a member of Estonian national swimming team.

Since 2003 she is coaching at the underwater swimming club in Maardu.

In 1998 and 2000-2010 she was named as Best Female Finswimmer of Estonia.

References

Living people
1983 births
Estonian female swimmers
Estonian sports coaches
Tallinn University of Technology alumni
Swimmers from Tallinn